"40 gradusov" is a song recorded by Ukrainian singer Loboda, released as a standalone single on 15 November 2012 by Zion Music. The song was written by Monatik and Loboda, and produced by Natella Krapivina.

Music video
A music video was shot for the song in Iceland. According to Loboda, the Nordic landscape was not chosen by chance, every time she listened to the song, she thought about the cold, loneliness and unhappy love. The main role was played by the Danish actor Rudi Køhnke. Especially for the filming, the singer took ballet lessons, and also learned to play the cello.

Commercial performance
In the ninth week of its stay in the Ukrainian chart Tophit the song topped the chart, and remained at the top spot for twelve weeks. At the end of 2013, it became the third most popular song on Ukrainian radio according to Tophit. In Russia, the song took the 57th place in Tophit chart, at that time it was the best result for the singer in the chart.

Awards and nominations
The song became the winner of many music awards, it won in all the declared categories. In 2020 the song was included in the list "20 iconic songs for 20 years" of the Ukrainian music award YUNA.

Track listing

Charts

Weekly charts

Year-end charts

References

2012 singles
2012 songs
Music videos shot in Iceland
Russian-language songs
Svetlana Loboda songs